Mosquito Creek is a creek in the Cariboo region of British Columbia. The creek is a tributary of Willow River. This creek was discovered to be gold bearing in 1861. It has been mined and produced an estimated $3,500,000 in gold.

References

External links
 

Rivers of British Columbia
Cariboo Land District